Scott Connor Kashket (born 25 February 1996) is an English professional footballer who plays as a striker for League Two club Gillingham. He has also played in his youth career for Spanish B side club Hércules, Wingate & Finchley, and Leyton Orient, and in his senior career for League Two Leyton Orient, National League South Welling United (on loan), Wycombe Wanderers and Crewe Alexandra.

Early life
Kashket was born in Chigwell, Essex, in England and is Jewish. His father Russell Kashket, and grandfather Bernard Kashket, are tailors and run Kashket & Partners, a UK company that traces its history back to being hatters at the court of the Russian Tsar in the early 1900s.

Career

Early career
Kashket began his career playing futsal for Maccabi GB in the English National Futsal League. He played for the Team Maccabi Great Britain junior futsal team at the European Maccabiah Games in Vienna in 2009, winning a bronze medal.

He was spotted and signed at age 16 by Spanish B side club Hércules, following a spell with Buckhurst Hill, he played for their 16–19 and 18–21 age group football teams in late 2012.  

Kashket returned to the UK, and played for the Wingate & Finchley U21 team. He scored three goals in two matches during October 2013.

He played for Team GB Under-18 at the 2013 Maccabiah Games in Israel, winning a bronze medal.

In November 2013, Kashket had a trial with Maccabi Tel Aviv. However, he suffered an ankle ligaments injury on his first day with the club.

Leyton Orient

By this time Kashket was training and playing with Leyton Orient's youth team. After impressing in the Orient youth team, Kashket at 17 years old signed a two-year professional contract with the club in the summer of 2014, while still featuring for the youth team. He scored a penalty in Orient's 3–2 friendly win at Dartford on 18 July, and came on as a substitute in the 1–0 friendly win at Northampton Town on 26 July, and the 2–2 draw with Queens Park Rangers on 29 July.

Kashket was an unused substitute for Orient in several matches in the early part of the 2014–15 season, and made his professional debut as a late substitute for Jay Simpson in the 2–0 league defeat at home to Preston North End on 29 October, which was manager Mauro Milanese's first match in charge of the club. On 11 November, he was brought on as a substitute (again for Simpson) early in the second half in Orient's 2–0 Football League Trophy southern section quarter-final win against Northampton Town.

Kashket made his first start for Orient on 11 August 2015, playing the full 90 minutes of the 2–1 League Cup defeat at MK Dons. He scored his first senior goal in the 2–2 draw at home to Oxford United on 17 October, coming on as a substitute for John Marquis and grabbing a last-minute equaliser. He was told chairman Francesco Becchetti had  blocked him from playing. Kashket said: "He wouldn't even give me reasons why, he wouldn't even let me train. I just wanted to get out of there and make a fresh start as soon as possible."

On 4 March 2016, he moved to National League South Welling United on a one-month loan.  On 31 August 2016 Kashket was released from Leyton Orient, for which he had made 22 appearances and scored once.

Wycombe Wanderers
The same day that Kashket was released, Wycombe Wanderers signed Kashket to a four-month deal, when he was 20 years old. He scored his first goals for Wycombe when he scored twice in a 5–1 win over Crewe Alexandra on 27 September 2016. Wycombe manager Gareth Ainsworth said, "We gave Scott the opportunity to prove himself ... and to say he exceeded expectations is an understatement." He won the Sky Bet League Two Player of the Month Award for December 2016.

In December 2016, after he had scored nine goals in nine games, the team signed Kashket to a new contract, until 2019. He suffered an injury, and missed the majority of the final third of the season in 2016. In the 2016-17 season, he made 21 appearances and had ten goals, a ratio of one every 117 minutes.

Kashket signed a new three-year contract with Wycombe in May 2019, until 2022; at the time that he signed the new contract, in his career with the team he had scored 23 times in 73 appearances. Coach Ainsworth said: "Scotty’s got that fantastic ability of being able to change a game in an instant and he’s the type of player that fans love to watch, so I’m thrilled to keep him here for another three years. He’s still only 23 and I strongly believe he could go a long way in the game ...."

In January 2020 Kashket received a ban from all football activity for a period of two months, with an additional four months suspended, and a fine of £3,446.13 after he admitted to breaking the Football Association's betting rules after placing 183 bets on matches between 3 September 2014 and 22 August 2016, while at Leyton Orient.

On 30 August 2021, Kashket left the club by mutual consent in order to allow for him to sign with a new club ahead of the deadline the following day.

Crewe Alexandra
On 30 August 2021, having left Wycombe, Kashket joined League One side Crewe Alexandra on a one-year deal. He scored his first Crewe goal in a 1–1 draw at Plymouth Argyle on 28 September 2021. Kashket made 14 appearances for Crewe before sustaining an ankle injury at Ipswich Town on 28 November 2021. He made a return to competitive football on 29 March 2022, playing 30 minutes of a Cheshire Senior Cup semi-final at Stockport County, then starting in Crewe's next league game, against Fleetwood Town at Gresty Road on 2 April 2022. Kashket was released at the end of the 2021–22 season following relegation.

Gillingham
On 27 June 2022, Kashket signed for League Two side, Gillingham.

Personal life
Kashket is of Russian descent, with his great-grandfather moving to London in the 1920s.

Career statistics

Honours
Wycombe Wanderers
EFL League One play-offs: 2020
Individual

 League Two Player of the Month: December 2016

See also
List of select Jewish football (association; soccer) players

References

External links
Profile at the Wycombe Wanderers F.C. website

1996 births
Living people
People from Chigwell
Sportspeople from Essex
Jewish footballers
English Jews
English people of Russian-Jewish descent
English men's futsal players
Futsal players in England
English footballers
Association football forwards
Hércules CF players
Leyton Orient F.C. players
Welling United F.C. players
Wingate & Finchley F.C. players
Wycombe Wanderers F.C. players
Crewe Alexandra F.C. players
Gillingham F.C. players
English Football League players
National League (English football) players
Competitors at the 2013 Maccabiah Games
Maccabiah Games bronze medalists for Great Britain
Maccabiah Games footballers